"Mijn stad" is a song by Danny de Munk. It is the eleventh track of his 1985 self-titled debut Danny de Munk, the b-side to the single was "Vergeet nu maar je zorgen" (English: Forget your worries). It was the follow up single to his debut "Ik voel me zo verdomd alleen" (English: I feel so damn lonely).; the lead single from the soundtrack from a feature film in which he starred, titled Ciske de Rat from 1984.

The song is an ode to Amsterdam, Danny de Munk's hometown in which he was born and raised.

The song is frequently heard at the Amsterdam Arena during home matches of AFC Ajax the local football club from the city.

References
Footnotes

External links
 Danny de Munk's "Mijn stad" music video on YouTube

Danny de Munk songs
1984 singles
Dutch pop songs
Dutch-language songs
Songs about Amsterdam
AFC Ajax songs
Football songs and chants
1984 songs
RCA Records singles